Blackberry Farm is a series of children's literature stories. They were written by Jane Pilgrim, and first published around 1950. The original books were illustrated in colour by F. Stocks May. Published by the Brockhampton Press of Leicester, they originally retailed at One Shilling and Sixpence.

The series described events on a fictional farm, Blackberry Farm, situated on the outskirts of an unnamed English village. The farm, seemingly a sheep and dairy property, is owned by Mr and Mrs Smiles, who have two children, Joy and Bob, but the central characters of the stories are various animals. Most of the animals, although depicted at their normal size, appear to speak English and interact with the human characters.

The series of stories include:

 Emily the Goat
 Rusty the Sheepdog
 Postman Joe
 Mrs Nibble
 Henry Goes Visiting
 Mother Hen and Mary
 Naughty George
 Mrs Squirrel And Hazel
 The Birthday Picnic
 Ernest Owl Starts A School
 The Adventures Of Walter
 Lucy Mouse Keeps a Secret
 Walter Duck and Winifred
 Mrs Nibble Moves House
 Christmas at Blackberry Farm
 Sports Day at Blackberry Farm
 Little Martha
 A Bunny in Trouble
 Hide and Seek at Blackberry Farm
 Poor Mr Nibble
 Snow at Blackberry Farm
 Mr Nibble Calls a Doctor
 Sam Sparrow
 Saturday at Blackberry Farm
 Mr Mole Takes Charge

Children's books about friendship
British children's books
Pigs in literature
Series of children's books
Fictional farms